Lemberg is a town in Saskatchewan, Canada. It was founded by ethnic Germans immigrants from Lviv (Austria-Hungary, now Ukraine), for which the German name was "Lemberg" as part of the Great Economic Emigration away from Galicia and Lodomeria.

Demographics 

Religion
Lemberg is currently home to four places of worship: Saint Michael's Roman Catholic Church, Trinity Lutheran Church, Grace United Church, and the Pentecostal Assembly. A Baptist church once stood just south of Lemberg, but all that remains now is the cemetery.

Points of Interest
Historic Sites
Weissenberg Roman Catholic Public School #49
Saint Michael’s Roman Catholic Church
Pool Grain Elevator
Trinity Lutheran Church
War Memorial Cenotaph
Recreational Facilities
Lemberg Baseball Park
Town Campgrounds
Lemberg Rink (Skating and Curling)
Community Hall Complex (5 pin Bowling, Pool, Foosball table, Shuffleboard, Table Tennis, Snack Bar)
Lemberg Lions’ Playground
Walking Trails and Mercy Grotto

Notable people
The Right Honourable James Garfield Gardiner, premier of Saskatchewan from 1926 to 29 and 1934–35

Education
Lemberg is the home of North Valley High School (grades 7-12). North Valley Elementary School (grades K-6) is located in the neighbouring town of Neudorf.

See also 

 List of communities in Saskatchewan
 List of towns in Saskatchewan
 Lemberg Airport

References

Towns in Saskatchewan
Ukrainian-Canadian culture in Saskatchewan